Raymond Davis Kell (June 7, 1904 – November 2, 1986), most often known as Ray Kell, was an American television researcher at RCA.  He was awarded the Stuart Ballantine Medal in 1948 for being a pioneer in the development of color television.

Kell was born on June 7, 1904 in Kell, Illinois, and received his B.S. degree in electrical engineering from the University of Illinois in 1926. From 1927 to 1930 he was engaged in television research in the radio consulting laboratory of General Electric. From 1930 to 1941 he worked in the research division of the RCA Manufacturing Company, and from 1941 he was with the RCA Laboratories Division. He received a "Modern Pioneer" award from the National Association of Manufacturers in February 1940 for inventions in television. Kell died in Mesa, Arizona on November 2, 1986, at the age of 82.

See also
 Kell factor
 George H. Brown

References

External links
 Brief biography with picture
 Old TV pictures including one of Kell
 Biography on Engineering and Technology History Wiki

1904 births
1986 deaths
American electronics engineers